Bowen is a small lunar impact crater that is located to the southwest of the Montes Haemus, on the edge of a small lunar mare named the Lacus Doloris. It was named after American astronomer Ira S. Bowen. It is distinguished only by having a relatively flat floor, rather than being bowl-shaped like most small craters. Bowen was previously designated Manilius A. The crater Manilius is located to the south, at the opposite shore of the Lacus.

References

External links

 LTO-41C3 Bowen — L&PI topographic map

Impact craters on the Moon